lex Gabinia may refer to:

 lex Gabinia tabellaria (139 BC), on secret ballots
 lex Gabinia de piratis persequendis (67 BC), granting Pompey an extraordinary command against pirates in the Mediterranean